Bid Qatar-e Olya (also Romanized as Bīd Qaţār-e ‘Olyā; also known as Bīd Qaţār) is a village in Honam Rural District, in the Central District of Selseleh County, Lorestan Province, Iran. At the 2006 census, its population was 68, in 10 families.

References 

Towns and villages in Selseleh County